The following lists events that happened during 1975 in the Grand Duchy of Luxembourg.

Incumbents

Events

January – March
 6 February - A law is passed legalising divorce by mutual consent.
 22 March – Representing Luxembourg, Geraldine Branigan finishes fifth in the Eurovision Song Contest 1975 with the song Toi.

April – June

July – September
 21 July - Annette Schwall-Lacroix is appointed to the Council of State.
 16 September - Prime Minister Gaston Thorn is appointed President of the United Nations General Assembly.

October – December

Unknown
 Gross domestic product falls by 6.1%, mostly due to a collapse in the steel price.

Births
 17 October – Anne Kremer, tennis player

Deaths
 5 February - Foni Tissen, artist
 8 March – Joseph Bech, politician
 8 May – Pol Albrecht, composer
 1 October - Eugène Rodenbourg, member of the Council of State

Footnotes

References